Natalia Vladimirovna Poryvay (born 31 May 1973), well known as Natasha Korolyova, is a Russian singer of popular music. Meritorious Artist of Russia (2004).

Early career
Korolyova was born in Ukrainian capital Kyiv. She gave her first public performance in 1976, at the age of three, singing The Cruiser Aurora at the annual congress of the Komsomol. In 1985, at the age of 12, Korolyova recorded several songs including "World Without Miracles" and "Where Went the Circus", achieving popular success in Ukraine. In 1987, Korolyova won the  Golden Kamerton  music prize. From 1988 to 1991 she studied vocal performance at the Kyiv-pop circus school.

Korolyova made her first international appearances, in the United States, in 1989. Shortly thereafter she moved to Moscow. She participated in many competitions and television broadcasts, among them Christmas Meeting and Morning Mail. In 1990 she recorded the song Yellow Tulips, which launched her success both within the USSR and internationally. The song reached the finals of the Pesnya goda festival.

In 1992, Korolyova embarked on her first concert tour of Russia, concluding with major shows at the Olympic Stadium. She toured Israel in 1993, Germany in 1994, and performed in New York City in 1997.

Family
Natasha Korolyova has a sister, Russya, a successful Ukrainian singer. Her first husband was the well-known Russian pop singer-songwriter Igor Nikolayev. She is currently married to Sergei Glushko, who performs as a male stripper under the name 'Tarzan'. She has a son named Arkhip.

Mainstream success
Between 1990 and 1997, Koreleva made twelve music videos for television: Yellow Tulips (directed by  Mogilevskaya, 1990), First Kiss (directed by  Pesotsky), Under the Summer Rain (director  Vladimirov), Why the Love Dies (director  Pesotsky), Kyiv Boy (director  Pesotsky, 1993), Sunflowers (Fix, 1995), Is It Me? (Fix), Small Country (Gusev), The Man With Bellows (Fix, 1996), Do Not Die (Gavrilov), Summer Castanets (Nikolayev, 1997) and Diamonds of Tears (Bazhenov).

After her divorce from Igor Nikolayev, she released the albums Fragments of the Past, Heart, Believe It or Not and Paradise Where Are You.

She was a host and moderator of various television programs and concerts, and participated in the TV shows Dancing with the Stars (in Russia and Ukraine) and Two Stars. Her second husband, Sergey Glushko (better known as the male stripper Tarzan) was her partner on these projects.

Korolyova appeared in several film roles, including Recipe Witch and The Cheerful Family 2, the latter for Ukrainian television. She has also undertaken jewelry design, releasing a collection entitled Daughters-Mothers in 2008. In 2009, she published the novel Male Striptease.

In 2018 Korolyova was banned from entering Ukraine for three years because of "committing illegal acts related to encroachment on the territorial integrity of Ukraine. Using the media, she supports the actions of the Russian Federation on the annexation of Crimea". Crimea is currently under dispute by Russia and Ukraine. Korolyova lost a 2018 appeal at the Supreme Court of Ukraine; its verdict referred to Korolyova as "a foreigner."

Discography

Studio albums
 1991- Zhyoltye tyul'pany (Yellow Tulips)
 1992 - Del'fin i rusalka (Dolphin and the Mermaid), with Igor Nikolayev
 1993 - Poklonnik (Admirer)
 1995 - Konfetti (Confetti)
 1997 - Бриллианты Слёз (Diamonds Tears)
 2001 - Serdtse (Heart)
 2003 - Веришь Или Нет (Do You Trust Me or Not), with Tarzan
 2006 - Рай Там, Где Ты... (Where Are You, Paradise?)
2015 - Магия Л... (Magic L' )
2016 - Магия Л... переиздание (Magic L' revised)
2019 - Ягодка (Berry)

Notes

References

External links

 Unofficial site
 

1973 births
Living people
Musicians from Kyiv
Soviet pop singers
Russian pop singers
Russian people of Ukrainian descent
United Russia politicians
Pseudonymous artists
20th-century Russian women singers
20th-century Russian singers
Honored Artists of the Russian Federation
21st-century Russian women singers
21st-century Russian singers
Ukrainian pop singers
20th-century Ukrainian women singers
Winners of the Golden Gramophone Award